Abraham Janssen may refer to:
Sir Abraham Janssen, 2nd Baronet (c. 1699 – 1765) MP for Dorchester 1720-1722
Abraham Janssen (chess player)  (1720–1795) British chess player

See also
Abraham Janssens, painter